Nepal competed at the 1992 Summer Olympics in Barcelona, Spain.

Competitors
The following is the list of number of competitors in the Games.

Results by event

Athletics
Men's Marathon
 Hari Rokaya → 70th place (2:32.26)

References

Official Olympic Reports

Nations at the 1992 Summer Olympics
1992
1992 in Nepalese sport